Chthonerpeton onorei is a species of amphibian in the family Typhlonectidae, endemic to Ecuador. Its natural habitats are subtropical or tropical moist montane forests, rivers, swamps, freshwater marshes, intermittent freshwater marshes, pastureland, irrigated land, seasonally flooded agricultural land, and canals and ditches.

Originally the specie was limited to only southern Brazil, Uruguay, and northern Argentina.Then in 1984 and 1985 two specimens were collected by Dr. G. Onore in Ecuador and this helped extend the known range of the species. This discovery extended the range of the species by 4,250 km northwest from southern Brazil.

References

 

Amphibians described in 1986
onorei
Amphibians of Ecuador
Endemic fauna of Ecuador
Taxonomy articles created by Polbot